Rúben Miguel Nunes Vezo (born 25 April 1994) is a Portuguese professional footballer who plays for Spanish club Levante UD as a central defender or a right-back.

After starting his career at Vitória de Setúbal in the Primeira Liga, he spent several years in Spain's La Liga with Valencia, Granada and Levante, making 180 appearances in the competition.

Club career

Vitória Setúbal
Born in Setúbal to a Cape Verdean father and a Portuguese mother, Vezo joined local Vitória Futebol Clube's youth system at the age of 11. He was promoted to the first team for the 2013–14 season, and on 18 August made his Primeira Liga debut, starting in a 1–3 home loss against FC Porto.

During his short spell, Vezo featured the full 90 minutes in all the league matches he appeared in, save for the last five minutes of a 4–1 win at Vitória S.C. where he was sent off, and 34 against F.C. Arouca (1–0 home victory) for the same reason.

Valencia
On 4 November 2013, Vezo signed a four-year contract with Valencia CF for a reported fee of €1.5 million, with the move being made effective in the January transfer window. He made his La Liga debut on 8 February 2014, playing the last nine minutes in a 5–0 home defeat of Real Betis. Fifteen days later, profiting from suspension to compatriot Ricardo Costa, he played the full 90 minutes against Granada CF also at the Mestalla Stadium, and scored his first goal as a professional after netting from a free kick taken by Dani Parejo to help the hosts come from behind in the 90th minute and win it 2–1; in the process, he became the Spanish club's youngest ever foreigner to achieve that feat.

In 2015–16, Vezo took part in his first European campaigns in the UEFA Champions League and UEFA Europa League. He was dismissed on 24 November in a 2–0 group loss away to FC Zenit Saint Petersburg in the former for a foul on Oleg Shatov; following the drop into the latter he netted the final goal of a 10–0 aggregate win over SK Rapid Wien in the last 32 for Gary Neville's team.

Vezo joined Granada of the same league on 31 August 2016, in a season-long loan. He played 19 times as the Andalusians were relegated, and he was sent off on his second appearance in a 2–2 draw at Betis on 16 September.

In 2018–19, Vezo made only four league appearances in his last half-season at the Mestalla Stadium, but made five appearances in a Copa del Rey campaign that ended with conquest.

Levante
On 29 January 2019, Vezo moved across the city to Levante UD also in a temporary deal. Four days later, he made his debut in a goalless draw at home to Getafe CF; his first goal came in a 2–2 draw as RCD Espanyol visited the Estadi Ciutat de València on 21 April, and two weeks later another strike in a 4–1 victory over Rayo Vallecano all but secured survival at the opponents' expense. On 1 July, he agreed to a permanent five-year contract, for a club record €6 million with the first €5 million paid up front.

Vezo had to play in goal for the last minutes of the home fixture with Real Madrid on 22 August 2021, after Aitor Fernández was sent off and manager Paco López had already brought all five replacements in. He conceded no goals, in a 3–3 home draw.

International career
Vezo earned his first cap for the Portugal under-21 side on 5 March 2014 – one month shy of his 20th birthday – playing the full 90 minutes in a 2–0 home win against Macedonia for the 2015 UEFA European Championship qualifiers. He scored his first goal at that level in the same competition, on 14 October, helping defeat the Netherlands 5–4 in the play-offs, in Paços de Ferreira (7–4 on aggregate).

Career statistics

Honours
Valencia
Copa del Rey: 2018–19

References

External links

1994 births
Living people
Portuguese sportspeople of Cape Verdean descent
Sportspeople from Setúbal
Portuguese footballers
Association football defenders
Primeira Liga players
Vitória F.C. players
La Liga players
Segunda División players
Valencia CF players
Granada CF footballers
Levante UD footballers
Portugal youth international footballers
Portugal under-21 international footballers
Portuguese expatriate footballers
Expatriate footballers in Spain
Portuguese expatriate sportspeople in Spain
Outfield association footballers who played in goal